
Year 499 BC was a year of the pre-Julian Roman calendar. In the Roman Empire it was known as the Year of the Consulship of Aebutius and Cicurinus (or, less frequently, year 255 Ab urbe condita). The denomination 499 BC for this year has been used since the early medieval period, when the Anno Domini calendar era became the prevalent method in Europe for naming years.

Events 
 By place 

 Greece 
 After a failed attack on the rebellious island of Naxos in  501 BC (on behalf of the Persians), Aristagoras, tyrant of Miletus, to save himself from the wrath of Persia, plans a revolt with the Milesians and the other Ionians. With the encouragement of Histiaeus (his father-in-law and former tyrant of Miletus), Aristagoras induces the Ionian cities of Asia Minor to revolt against Persia, thus instigating the Ionian Revolt and beginning the Greco-Persian Wars between Greece and Persia. The pro-Persian tyrant of Mytilene is stoned to death.
 Miltiades the Younger, the ruler of the Thracian Chersonese, which has been under Persian suzerainty since approximately 514 BC, joins the Ionian revolt. He seizes the islands of Lemnos and Imbros from the Persians.
 Aristagoras seeks help with the revolt against the Persians from Cleomenes I, king of Sparta, but the Spartans are unwilling to respond.

References